The ranee mouse (Haeromys margarettae) is a species of rodent in the family Muridae.
It is restricted to the island of Borneo, in the provinces of Sarawak (Malaysia) and Sabah (Malaysia). Its natural habitat is subtropical or tropical dry forests.

References

 Baillie, J. 1996.  Haeromys margarettae.   2006 IUCN Red List of Threatened Species.   Downloaded on 19 July 2007.

Haeromys
Rodents of Indonesia
Rodents of Malaysia
Mammals described in 1893
Taxa named by Oldfield Thomas
Taxonomy articles created by Polbot